Perimeter Mall is a shopping mall in Perimeter Center, Dunwoody, Georgia, a suburb of Atlanta, near the interchange of Interstate 285 (the Perimeter) and Georgia State Route 400. It is the second largest shopping mall in the state of Georgia, the largest being the Mall of Georgia in Buford, Georgia.

The mall is anchored by Dillard's, Nordstrom, Von Maur, and Macy's.

Perimeter Mall is different from other shopping malls in Atlanta in that it includes open-air shops, upscale restaurants, and salons, connected by gardens and paths. It also features valet parking.

It can be accessed by MARTA's Dunwoody station, which opened at the southwest corner of its parking lot in 1996.

History 
Perimeter Mall opened in 1971 and was the fourth mall to open in DeKalb County, after Avondale Mall in 1964, North DeKalb Mall in 1965, and the Gallery at South DeKalb in 1968. Its original anchor stores were Rich's and JCPenney, which made it very similar in design and layout to the nearby Greenbriar Mall. Perimeter Mall was the first mall in metro Atlanta to be located outside of I-285. 

In 1977, the first Great American Cookie Company store opened at the mall.

In 1982, an additional wing that included a Davison's was added. This gave the mall a T shape.  Davison's became Macy's in 1986.

On April 25, 1990, James Calvin Brady, A 31-year-old man with a psychiatric history  opened fire with a revolver in the Food court, killing one person and injuring 4 others before turning himself in to the police.

A brand new 5-level parking garage was built in November 1997. 

On February 20, 1998, Nordstrom opened its first location in the Southeast, a 3-level 230,000 square foot store in the mall. The same year Nordstrom opened, the mall was expanded again.

Cheesecake Factory would officially open at Perimeter Mall in 2000. JCPenney closed that same year, and the store was demolished to make way for a new Dillard's, which opened in 2005.

The Rouse Company, the original owner of the mall, sold the property to General Growth Properties in 2003.

Rich's became Rich's-Macy's in 2003 and the original Macy's closed and became Bloomingdale's the same year. Rich's-Macy's became just Macy's in 2005.

In 2012, it was announced Von Maur would replace Bloomingdale's which would also close. On January 5,  announced that it would take over that location and would set up its second location in Georgia at the mall.

In 2013, the food court was renovated and a Chipotle Mexican Grill was added.

In 2015–2016, the mall underwent renovations including new ceramic flooring, new lighting, modern seating areas, updated restrooms and new signage. Some of the mall's original 1970s decor was replaced.

Finish Line and Lazy Dog will open.

List of anchor stores

References

External links
Official website

1971 establishments in Georgia (U.S. state)
Brookfield Properties
Buildings and structures in DeKalb County, Georgia
Dunwoody, Georgia
Shopping malls established in 1971
Shopping malls in the Atlanta metropolitan area
Tourist attractions in DeKalb County, Georgia